Cilix hispanica is a moth in the family Drepanidae. It is found in Portugal, Spain, southern France, Italy and North Africa.

There are two generations per year.

The larvae feed on Prunus species.

References

External links
Fauna Europaea

Moths described in 2002
Moths of Europe
Drepaninae